HMS Croome refers to one of two Royal Navy ships named after the Croome fox-hunt. Croome is a hamlet in East Riding, Yorkshire.

  was a  minesweeper launched in 1917 and sold in 1922.
  was a  launched in 1941 and scrapped in 1957.

Royal Navy ship names